This is a list of the French SNEP Top 200 Singles and Top 200 Albums number-ones of 2021.

Number ones by week

Singles chart

Albums chart

See also
2021 in music
List of number-one hits (France)
List of top 10 singles in 2021 (France)

References

France
2021
2021 in French music